

Heathen or Heathens may refer to:

Religion
Heathen, another name for a pagan
Heathen, an adherent of Heathenry

Music
Band of Heathens, a North American rock and roll band
Heathen (band), a North American thrash metal band
The Heathens, an Americana, indie rock band
Heathen (David Bowie album) (2002)
Heathen (Thou album) (2014)
Heathen, an album by Wyrd
"Heathens" (song), a song by Twenty One Pilots for the 2016 film Suicide Squad
"The Heathen", a song by Bob Marley from Exodus

Film
Heathen (film), a film by Ross Shepherd

Literature
"The Heathen", a short story by Jack London

See also
Heathenry (disambiguation)
Neo-pagan (disambiguation)
Pagan (disambiguation)